Bus-lès-Artois is a commune in the Somme department in Hauts-de-France in northern France.

Geography

Population

Places of interest
Church of Saint Pierre, constructed over several centuries, restored in 1804.
Château de 1848, built on the site of an old fort, to the north of the church.
The playing area of the Picard sport ‘:fr:ballon au poing’

See also
Communes of the Somme department

References

Communes of Somme (department)